KRI Malahayati (362) is an Indonesian Navy ship named after Malahayati, a national war hero from Aceh.

Design
Malahayati has a complement of 89 personnel, including 11 officers.

The ship are armed with one Bofors 120 mm Automatic Gun L/46, one Bofors 40 mm Automatic Gun L/70 and two Rheinmetall Mk 20 Rh-202 autocannons. For anti-submarine warfare, the ship are equipped with one Bofors 375 mm twin anti-submarine rocket launcher and two triple Mk 32 324 mm torpedo launchers. For surface warfare, Malahayati was equipped with four Exocet MM 38 anti-ship missile launchers. Due to obsolescence, the ship never carried the missiles since early 2000s.

Mid-life upgrade
The mid-life upgrade of KRI Malahayati was awarded to a consortium consisting of Navantia and Indra in 2016. The scope of the upgrade includes the installation of Indra's Rigel ESM system, Navantia DORNA Fire Control System and Navantia CATIZ Combat Management System.

On October 2020, PT. PAL finished KRI Malahayati Mid-Life Modernization works and proceed to hand over the ship to Indonesian navy.

Service history
Malahayati was laid down on 28 July 1977 at Wilton-Fijenoord, Schiedam, Netherlands. The ship was launched on 19 June 1978 and was commissioned on 21 March 1980.

References

 Jackson. Grange books. Destroyer, frigate, corvette. 2000

External links

 KRI Fatahillah on TNI-AL's (Indonesian Navy) website

Fatahillah-class corvettes
Ships built by Wilton-Fijenoord
1978 ships
Corvettes of the Cold War